Taar-e-Ankaboot is a Pakistani drama serial written by Fasih Bari Khan, directed by Mazhar Moin and produced by 7th Sky Entertainment. The drama stars Resham, Ali Tahir, Kiran Tabeir and Uzma Gillani in lead roles. It was first aired on 18 August 2013 on Geo Entertainment. It touched on many taboo and bold subjects such as prostitution, sexuality and black magic. After airing 11 episodes, the series was banned and its broadcast was stopped.

Cast
Resham as Tabinda
Ali Tahir as Baqir
Kiran Tabeir as Nain Tara
Uzma Gillani
Jia Ali as Taiba
Zainab Qayyum 
Samina Ahmad as Baqir's mother
Sohail Sameer

References

Pakistani drama television series
Pakistani horror fiction television series
Censorship in Pakistan
2013 Pakistani television series debuts
2013 Pakistani television series endings
Censored television series